Pigeon Creek  may refer to:

Pigeon Creek, Ohio, an unincorporated community
Pigeon Creek, a creek running from Princeton, Indiana to the Ohio River in Evansville
Pigeon Creek, a stream in Texas and Dent counties of southern Missouri
Pigeon Creek, a stream in Ripley County, Missouri
Pigeon Creek, the main tributary of the Tug Fork River in Mingo County, West Virginia
Pigeon Creek, a tidal inlet on San Salvador Island, The Bahamas

See also 
 Pigeon River (disambiguation)
 Pigeon (disambiguation)